Daniel Miguel was a Cuban second baseman in the Negro leagues and the Cuban League in 1899 and 1900.

Miguel played for the All Cubans in 1899. He went on to play in the Cuban League in 1900.

References

External links
Baseball statistics and player information from Seamheads

Year of birth missing
Year of death missing
Place of birth missing
Place of death missing
All Cubans players
Cuban baseball players
Baseball second basemen